NOS Alive (formerly Optimus Alive! and Optimus Alive) is an annual music and arts festival held in the Algés riverside, close to Lisbon, in Portugal. It is organized since 2007 by the Portuguese live entertainment company Everything is New. Its naming sponsor is telecommunications company NOS (previously named Optimus).

It takes place during the second week of July and lasts 3 or 4 days. It currently has six stages, including a stage dedicated to fado music and a stage dedicated to stand-up comedy. 

The next edition is scheduled to take place between 6 and 8 July 2023.

History 
The Alive festival was created by the live entertainment company Everything is New in 2007. The name of the festival is taken from the Pearl Jam song "Alive". The first edition occurred between 8 and 10 June 2007, under the name "Oeiras Alive!", and had two stages. The headliners were Pearl Jam, The Smashing Pumpkins and the Beastie Boys.

In its second edition, the date of the festival was changed to the second weekend of July and the name of the festival was changed to include a naming sponsor. Between 2008 and 2010, the festival was named "Optimus Alive!", after the telecommunications company Optimus. A third stage was added in the 2009 edition. The 2009 edition was also the only edition to date to have a day dedicated to heavy metal music in the main stage, which had Metallica as the headliner.

In 2011, the exclamation mark was dropped from the festival name, and it became "Optimus Alive" until 2014. To mark its 5th anniversary, an extra day was added to the festival, making it a 4-day event in 2011. A new bandstand stage was added in 2012.

In 2014 the naming sponsor company Optimus changed its name to NOS, and the festival name was changed accordingly to NOS Alive in 2015. 

A stage dedicated to stand-up comedy was also added in the 2014 edition. In 2016, a new stage dedicated to fado music was added.

The 2020 edition of NOS Alive was planned to happen between 8 and 11 July 2020, with Kendrick Lamar, Taylor Swift, Billie Eilish and The Strokes as headliners. On 19 May 2020, the festival was cancelled due to the Portuguese government's decision to prohibit all large-scale events in the country until 30 September 2020, amid the COVID-19 pandemic. Following this cancellation, NOS Alive '21 was scheduled to take place between 7 and 10 July 2021, with all tickets bought for 2020 valid for the new dates or refunded by request. In early May 2021, Álvaro Covões, CEO of Everything is New, expressed his doubts regarding the execution of the festival that year due to the continuing COVID-19 pandemic. The festival was cancelled once again on 20 May 2021, with the tickets remained valid for NOS Alive '22.

Location 
The festival takes place at the Passeio Marítimo de Algés, a riverside open-area close to the limits of the city of Lisbon. The nearest public transport stop is the Algés train station, which is part of the Cascais Line.

Editions

Media coverage 
NOS Alive has a media partnership with the Portuguese public broadcaster RTP and the radio station Rádio Comercial. RTP provides coverage of the festival, including transmission of selected concerts, in their streaming platform RTP Play.

See also

List of rock festivals

References

External links

Everything is New official website

Music festivals in Portugal
Arts festivals in Portugal
Rock festivals in Portugal
Algés (Oeiras)
Festivals in Lisbon
Annual events in Lisbon
Music festivals established in 2007
2007 establishments in Portugal
Tourist attractions in Lisbon District
Summer events in Portugal

Vetusta Morla